Charles Edward Ramsey (born March 25, 1961) is an American athlete and college basketball coach. He is the former head men's basketball coach at Eastern Michigan University.

Early life
Ramsey was born in Ypsilanti, Michigan and graduated from Ypsilanti High School in 1979, where he played on the baseball, basketball and football teams. He played collegiately for Fisk University from 1979 to 1981, and was named All-American. In 1992, Ramsey graduated from Eastern Michigan University.

Ramsey was inducted into the Ypsilanti High School Athletic Hall of Fame where he was a 3 sport athlete in Football, Basketball, and Baseball. He was a member of Kappa Alpha Psi fraternity, initiated at Delta Nu chapter.

Career
He has been an assistant basketball coach at the University of California, Drake University, Tennessee State and the University of Michigan.
 
He accepted the head coaching position at his alma mater, Eastern Michigan, in 2005. He served as head coach until 2011. Ramsey's 68 career wins (after the 2011 season) put him 5th on the all-time career win list for EMU coaches. Ben Braun tops the list with 185 wins followed by Elton Rynearson with 160.

Ramsey was inducted into the Ypsilanti High School Hall of Fame in 2008, and is a member of the National Association of Basketball Coaches.

Family life
Ramsey and his wife Allison (deceased) have two sons, Charles (Tre’) and Chandler. They live in Ypsilanti. Was remarried to Janel N Ramsey 1/1/19, a son Jaden and daughter Ciara.

Head coaching record

References

External links
 
Bio on Eastern Michigan's athletics site
	

1961 births
Living people
African-American basketball coaches
African-American basketball players
American men's basketball players
Basketball coaches from Michigan
Basketball players from Michigan
California Golden Bears men's basketball coaches
College men's basketball head coaches in the United States
Drake Bulldogs men's basketball coaches
Eastern Michigan Eagles men's basketball coaches
Eastern Michigan Eagles men's basketball players
Fisk Bulldogs basketball players
Michigan Wolverines men's basketball coaches
Sportspeople from Ypsilanti, Michigan
Tennessee State Tigers basketball coaches
21st-century African-American people
20th-century African-American sportspeople